Bithika Dev is an Indian politician. She was elected to the Assam Legislative Assembly from Silchar as a member of the Indian National Congress. Her husband Santosh Mohan Dev was a Cabinet Minister of India.

References

Indian National Congress politicians from Assam
Members of the Assam Legislative Assembly
Living people
Year of birth missing (living people)